Balkan Union may refer to:

 Balkan Federation
 Greek–Yugoslav confederation